Uji Station (宇治駅) is the name of two train stations in Japan:

 Uji Station (JR West)
 Uji Station (Keihan)